Roberto Lopes may refer to:
Roberto Lopes da Costa (born 1966), Brazilian volleyball player
Roberto Lopes (footballer, born 1983), Brazilian footballer
Roberto Lopes (footballer, born 1992), Cape Verdean footballer

See also
Roberto López (disambiguation)
Robert Lopez (disambiguation)